Aleksandr Petrovich Kotelnikov (October 20, 1865 – March 6, 1944) was a Russian and Soviet mathematician specializing in geometry and kinematics.

Biography 
The subject of hyperbolic geometry was non-Euclidean geometry, a departure from tradition. The early exposure to Lobachevsky's work eventually led to Aleksandr undertaking the job of editing Lobachevsky's works. 

Kotelnikov studied at Kazan University, graduating in 1884. He began teaching at a gymnasium. 
Having an interest in mechanics, he did graduate study. His thesis was The Cross-Product Calculus and Certain of its Applications in Geometry and Mechanics. His work contributed to the development of screw theory and kinematics. Kotelnikov began instructing at the university in 1893. His habilitation thesis was The Projective Theory of Vectors (1899). 

In Kiev, Kotelnikov was professor and head of the department of pure mathematics until 1904. Returning to Kazan, he headed the mathematics department until 1914. He was at the Kyiv Polytechnic Institute directing the department of Theoretical Mechanics until 1924, when he moved to Moscow and took up teaching at Bauman Technical University.

In addition to the Works of Lobachevsky, Kotelnikov was also the editor of the collected works of Nikolay Zhukovsky, the father of Russian aerodynamics.

One reviewer put Kotelnikov at the head of a chain of investigations of Spaces over Algebras. Successive researchers included D.N. Zeiliger, A.P. Norden, and B. A. Rosenfel'd.

Dual quaternions

Kotelnikov advanced an algebraic method of representing Euclidean motions that had been introduced by William Kingdon Clifford. Though developed to render motions in three-dimensional space, an eight-dimensional algebra of doubled quaternions  was used. Clifford had shown that a space of rotations entailed elliptic space described by versors in his four-dimensional quaternions.

Using the inner product on  formed by taking the product of a quaternion with its conjugate, the condition 
 is equivalent to 
 and implies that elliptic lines  are perpendicular. Under these conditions, the Kotelnikov conversion to Euclidean motion is represented as
 and where  is the screw axis.

Other works
 1925: Introduction to Theoretical Mechanics, Moscow-Leningrad
 1927: The Principle of Relativity and Lobachevsky's Geometry, Kazan
 1950: The Theory of Vectors and Complex Numbers, Moscow-Leningrad

References

Literature 
 A.T. Grigorian (1976) "Aleksandr Petrovich Kotelnikov", Dictionary of Scientific Biography.
  B.L. Laptev & B.A. Rozenfel'd (1996) Mathematics of the 19th Century: Geometry, page 87, Birkhäuser Verlag  .
 

1865 births
1944 deaths
19th-century mathematicians from the Russian Empire
20th-century Russian mathematicians
Mathematicians from Kazan
Academic staff of Bauman Moscow State Technical University
Academic staff of the D. Mendeleev University of Chemical Technology of Russia
Academic staff of Kazan Federal University
Academic staff of Kyiv Polytechnic Institute
Stalin Prize winners
Recipients of the Order of the Red Banner of Labour
Russian mathematicians
Soviet mathematicians